Thomas Henry Wilson (10 June 1841 – 31 January 1929) was an English first-class cricketer. Wilson occasionally played as a wicketkeeper.

Wilson made his debut in county cricket for Huntingdonshire in 1862 against North Northamptonshire. Wilson played non first-class games for Huntingdonshire between 1862 and 1869, with Wilson's final match for Huntingdonshire coming against Buckinghamshire in 1869.

In 1869 Wilson made his first-class debut for Hampshire against the Marylebone Cricket Club. In 1870 Wilson played two more matches for Hampshire, both against Lancashire. Ten years later Wilson represented Hampshire in a non first-class match against Somerset. Wilson scored 23 runs for Hampshire and made one stumping.

In 1869 Wilson made his debut for the Marylebone Cricket Club in a non first-class match against Winchester College; indeed all of Wilson's appearances for the Marylebone Cricket Club did not have first-class status. Wilson's final appearance for the Marylebone Cricket Club came against Bedfordshire in 1900.

Wilson died at San Miguel de Tucumán, Argentina on 31 January 1929.

External links
Thomas Wilson at Cricinfo
Thomas Wilson at CricketArchive

1841 births
1929 deaths
English cricketers
Hampshire cricketers
Marylebone Cricket Club cricketers